The Montparnasse derailment occurred at 16:00 on 22 October 1895 when the Granville–Paris Express overran the buffer stop at its Gare Montparnasse terminus. With the train several minutes late and the driver trying to make up for lost time, it approached the station too fast and the driver's application of the train air brake was ineffective. After running through the buffer stop, the train crossed the station concourse and crashed through the station wall; the locomotive fell onto the Place de Rennes below, where it stood on its nose. Although the passengers survived, a woman in the street below was killed by falling masonry.

Derailment
On 22 October 1895, the Granville to Paris and Montparnasse express, operated by Chemins de fer de l'Ouest, was made up of steam locomotive No. 721 (a type 2-4-0, French notation 120) hauling three luggage vans, a post van, and six passenger coaches. The train had left Granville on time at 08:45, but was several minutes late as it approached its Paris Montparnasse terminus with 131 passengers on board. A woman in the street below was killed by falling masonry, and two passengers, the fireman, two guards and a passerby in the street sustained injuries.

The woman, Marie-Augustine Aguilard, had been standing in for her husband, a newspaper vendor, while he went to collect the evening newspapers.

Aftermath
The locomotive driver was sentenced to two months in prison and fined 50 francs for approaching the station too fast. One of the guards was fined 25 francs as he had been preoccupied with paperwork and failed to apply the handbrake.

The railway company settled with the family of the deceased woman, and arranged for the education of her two young children, as well as proposing future employment for them.

The passenger carriages were undamaged and were easily removed. It took 48 hours before the legal process and investigation allowed the railway to start removing the locomotive and tender. An attempt was made to move the locomotive with 14 horses, but this failed. A 250 tonne winch, with 10 men, first lowered the locomotive to the ground and then lifted the tender back into the station. When the locomotive reached the railway workshops it was found to have suffered little damage.

Legacy

The wreckage remained outside the station for several days and a number of photographs were taken, such as those attributed to Studio Lévy and Sons, L. Mercier, and Henri Roger-Viollet.

The Lévy and Sons photograph has become one of the most famous in transportation history. The photograph, which is now in the public domain, is used as the cover page in the book An Introduction to Error Analysis by John Taylor. The photograph is featured on the album covers for Lean Into It by American rock band Mr. Big and Scrabbling at the Lock by Dutch rock band The Ex with Tom Cora, both first released in 1991, and the 2019 album Warranty Void If Removed by French recording artist Dial-up Jeremy.

A train crash with a similar chain of events occurs in the 1998 (season 5) episode of Thomas and Friends called "A Better View for Gordon". The incident also features during a dream in the 2007 novel The Invention of Hugo Cabret and its 2011 film adaptation, Hugo. It is depicted in the comic book series The Extraordinary Adventures of Adèle Blanc-Sec, in the 1978 fourth album Momies en folie.

Citations

General sources

External links
 

15th arrondissement of Paris
1890s in Paris
1895 in France
Derailments in France
Disasters in Paris
Rail transport in Paris
Railway accidents in 1895
1895 disasters in France